The International Coalition to Stop Crimes Against Humanity in North Korea (ICNK) was formed on September 8, 2011. It comprises Amnesty International, Human Rights Watch and the International Federation for Human Rights and has support from over 40 organizations worldwide. North Korean human rights issues with which the ICNK deals include North Korea’s political prison camp system and the repatriation and punishment of North Korean refugees.

Mission
As stated by ICNK: 
ICNK was formed with the goal of establishing a UN Commission of Inquiry to investigate Crimes against Humanity in North Korea. In order to achieve this, the ICNK worked to raise public understanding and awareness of the human rights situation in North Korea.

In 2013 the UN Human Rights Council did establish the Commission of Inquiry on Human Rights in the DPRK with resolution 22/13, with a landmark report published in 2014.

Activities
In January 2012 ICNK sent an open letter to Kim Jong-un. In March 2012 ICNK submitted a petition to the United Nations Human Rights Council to employ its special procedures mechanism to help shut down the North Korean political prison camps.

Participating Organizations
List of member organizations:
 Advocates International Global Council
 The Association for the Rescue of North Korea Abductees, Chiangmai
 Japanese Lawyers Association for Abduction and Other Human Rights Issues in North Korea
 Asian Human Rights & Humanity Association of Japan
 The Society to Help Returnees to North Korea
 Simon Wiesenthal Center
 Prayer Service Action Love Truth for North Korea (PSALT NK)
 People in Need (Czech Republic)
 Odhikar
 North Korea Freedom Coalition
 No Fence
 Network for North Korean Democracy and Human Rights (NKnet)
 Life Funds for NK Refugees
 Liberty in North Korea (LiNK)
 Kontras
 Justice 4 North Korea
 Jubilee Campaign USA
 International Center for Transitional Justice
 Human Rights in Asia
 Human Rights Watch
 Han Voice
 Freedom House
 International Federation for Human Rights (FIDH)
 Democracy Network against North Korean Gulag (Free NK Gulag)
 Conectas
 The Committee for Human Rights in North Korea
 Christian Solidarity Worldwide (CSW)
 BurmaInfo
 Burma Partnership
 Asian Federation Against Involuntary Disappearances
 Asia Justice and Rights (AJAR)
 Amnesty International Japan
 Amnesty International
 Aegis Trust
 Open North Korea

See also 
 Human rights in North Korea
 Yodok concentration camp

References

External links
International Coalition to Stop Crimes Against Humanity in North Korea - Homepage of the ICNK
Committee for Human Rights in North Korea: The Hidden Gulag - Overview of North Korean prison camps with testimonies and satellite photographs
Amnesty International: North Korea: Political Prison Camps - Document on camp conditions (torture, executions, hunger, child labor, forced labor) in Yodok and other camps
Freedom House: Concentrations of inhumanity – Analysis of the phenomena of repression associated with North Korea’s political labor camps
Christian Solidarity Worldwide: North Korea: A case to answer – a call to act – Report to emphasize the urgent need to respond to mass killings, arbitrary imprisonment, torture and related international crimes

North Korean democracy movements
Human rights organizations based in South Korea
Organizations specializing in North Korean issues
Organizations established in 2011